Sarah Greville, Countess of Warwick (born Lady Sarah Elizabeth Savile; 4 February 1786 – 30 January 1851), formerly Lady Monson, was the wife of Henry Greville, 3rd Earl of Warwick.

Lady Sarah was the daughter of John Savile, 2nd Earl of Mexborough and his wife, the former Elizabeth Stephenson. The family home was at Methley Park, near Leeds.  Her mother, the Countess of Mexborough, died in 1821. Lady Sarah's elder brother, John, at the time known as Viscount Pollington, served as MP for Pontefract and became the 3rd Earl on the death of their father, in 1830.

On 30 October 1807, Lady Sarah married John George Monson, 4th Baron Monson of Burton, becoming Lady Monson. Her husband died in 1809, aged 24. They had one child, Frederick John Monson, 5th Baron Monson of Burton, who married Theodosia Blacker in 1832, but died childless in 1841.

On 21 October 1816, Lady Monson remarried, at St. James's, Westminster, becoming Countess of Warwick. They had one son, George Greville (1818-1893), known during his father's lifetime as Lord Brooke.

After the death of her elder son, Lord Monson, the countess continued to use his seat at Gatton Park as an occasional home. She was considered a notable philanthropist, her obituary saying:"The life of this estimable lady was spent in one undiminishing and unceasing course of charity, kindness and benevolence; which was equally felt in the neighbourhood of Warwick Castle, and in the vicinity of her son Lord Monson's mansion at Gatton."

She died in January 1851, at Clifton Gardens, in London, aged 64, and was buried in St Andrew's churchyard, at Gatton. Her husband survived her by two years, dying in August 1853, aged 74. He was succeeded to the earldom by their son.

References

1786 births
1851 deaths
British countesses